Money for All is an EP released 2007 by the band Nine Horses, featuring David Sylvian, Steve Jansen and Burnt Friedman. The EP includes three new songs: "Money for All," "Get the Hell Out," and "Birds Sing for Their Lives." The others are remixes.

Background 

Sylvian said about the project in 2012:

Track listing
All lyrics by David Sylvian except "Birds Sing for Their Lives" by Stina Nordenstam; all music by Sylvian and Burnt Friedman except where noted.

 "Money for All" – 4:09
 "Get the Hell Out" (Steve Jansen, Sylvian) – 5:37
 "The Banality of Evil" (Burnt Friedman Remix) – 6:48
 "Wonderful World" (Burnt Friedman Remix) – 7:04
 "Birds Sing for Their Lives" – 7:02
 "Serotonin" (Burnt Friedman Remix) – 4:51
 "Money for All" (Version) – 4:00
 "Get the Hell Out" (Burnt Friedman Remix) (Jansen, Sylvian) – 5:04

Personnel
David Sylvian – vocals, electric piano (1, 2, 7), guitar (1, 7), harmonica (1, 7), arrangement (3, 4, 6), mixing, art direction
Steve Jansen – samples (2, 4, 8), drum programming (2, 8), percussion (4), keyboards (4), synth (8), mixing
Hayden Chisholm – clarinet (exc. 2, 5, 8)
Daniel Schröter – double bass (1, 5, 7), bass (6, 8)
Burnt Friedman – drum programming (exc. 2, 5), synth (1, 3, 6, 7), effects (3, 4, 6), electronics (8)
Morten Grønvad – vibraphone (1, 7)
Beverlei Brown, Tommy Blaize – backing vocals (1, 6, 7)
Andrea Grant, Derek Green – backing vocals (1, 7)
Claudio Bohorquez – cello (3, 4)
Thomas Elbern – acoustic guitar (3), electric guitar (4, 6)
Joseph Suchy – guitar (3, 6)
Norbert Krämer – timpani (4)
Stina Nordenstam – vocals (4, 5)
Tim Motzer – guitar (6)
Alexander Meyen  – violin (8)

Additional personnel
Atsushi Fukui – cover artwork
Chris Bigg  – design

References 

2007 albums
Samadhi Sound albums
David Sylvian albums